The Blacklist Festival is a three-day tribute to art and film. The festival is held each year in South Lake Tahoe, California, United States, and was originally started by a group of filmmakers and artists under the productions of 1134 Films. The objective of the festival is to present original and unapologetic art and films. The film screening and art display is held inside MontBleu Resort Casino & Spa and the music, after party and awards are held at various local venues. The Blacklist festival is dedicated to the people and arts that keep this world in balance.

Award winners

Best Film
2006 Beast In Show - "Tour De Dude", directed by Brandon Rein
2007 Beast In Show - "Se Voir", directed by Jeff Speed
2008 Beast in Show - "Chickenfut", directed by Harrison Witt

Best Music Video
2008 Criminal Record Award - "Sounds of Truth", directed by Brian Thompson

Best Work of Art
2007 Art Beast - Shannon Orcutt
2008 Art Beast - Thatcher Unsworth

Festival bands
2006 - Horror Business, Marones, Abaddon
2007 - ArnoCorps, Horror Business, Hyenas
2008 - Diablo Dimes, The Formaldabrides, The Hangmen, Naked Aggression
2009 - Catch Hell, Anxiety, The Dogs

Notes

Further reading

External links 
 

Film festivals in California
South Lake Tahoe, California
Tourist attractions in El Dorado County, California